Bycz  is a village in the administrative district of Gmina Bytom Odrzański, within Nowa Sól County, Lubusz Voivodeship, in western Poland.

The village has a population of 140.

References

Bycz